Fire In the Sky is an album by the rock group Half Japanese, released in 1993. "Tears Stupid Tears" is a cover of the Daniel Johnston song.

Critical reception

Dean McFarlane of AllMusic called Fire in the Sky "the album that pushed the group from the obscure fringe of the U.S. post-punk underground into a full-blown indie rock legend." Trouser Press wrote that "Jad [Fair] works up a head of punk-rock steam that allows him to zoom manically through hi-energy blasts like 'U.F.O. Expert' and 'Tears Stupid Tears.'”

Track listing

Personnel
Jad Fair - vocals, megaphone
Don Fleming - guitar, vocals, organ
Hank Beckmeyer - guitar, bas backing vocal
John Sluggett - drums, guitar bass, backing vocal
Maureen Tucker - drums
Ira Kaplan - guitar
David Doris - saxophone

References 

Half Japanese albums
1993 albums
Albums produced by Maureen Tucker